Xinpi Township, also spelled Sinpi, is a rural township in Pingtung County, Taiwan.

Geography
Population: 9,540 (February 2023)
Area:

Administrative divisions
The township comprises seven villages: Datie, Jiangong, Jihu, Nanfeng, Wanlong, Xiangtan and Xinbei.

References

External links 

Shinpi Government website 

Townships in Pingtung County